The following is a list of awards and nominations received by Switchfoot, an American alternative rock band.

ASCAP Awards
American Society of Composers, Authors and Publishers (ASCAP) honors its top members in a series of annual awards shows in seven different music categories: pop, rhythm and soul, film and television, Latin, country, Christian, and concert music.

|-
| align="center"| 1997
| Switchfoot
| Best New Artist
| 
|-
| align="center" rowspan="2" | 2006
| Jon Foreman
| Impact Award awarded "to celebrate the success and influence of his songs in mainstream rock music"
| 
|-
| "Dare You to Move"
| Top 50 list of Most Performed Song of 2005
| 
|-

GMA Dove Awards
GMA Dove Award is an accolade by the Gospel Music Association (GMA) of the United States to recognize outstanding achievement in the Christian music industry.

|-
| align="center" rowspan="3"| 2004
| "Ammunition"
| Rock Recorded Song of the Year
| 
|-
| The Beautiful Letdown
| Rock/Contemporary Album of the Year
| 
|-
| "Meant to Live"
| Rock/Contemporary Recorded Song of the Year
| 
|-
| align="center" rowspan="4"| 2005
| Switchfoot
| Artist of the Year
| 
|-
| rowspan="2"| "Dare You to Move"
| Rock/Contemporary Recorded Song of the Year
| 
|-
| Short Form Music Video of the Year
| 
|-
| Live In San Diego
| Long Form Music Video of the Year
| 
|-
| align="center"| 2006
| "Stars"
| Short Form Music Video of the Year
| 
|-
| align="center"| 2010
| "Mess of Me"
| Rock Recorded Song of the Year
| 
|-
| align="center" rowspan="2"| 2012
| "Dark Horses"
| Rock Recorded Song of the Year
| 
|-
| Vice Verses
| Rock Album of the Year
| 
|-
| align="center"|2013
| "Afterlife"
| Rock/Contemporary Recorded Song of the Year
| 
|-
| align="center"rowspan="3"| 2014
| Switchfoot
| Artist of the Year
| 
|-
| "Love Alone Is Worth the Fight"
| Rock/Contemporary Song of the Year
| 
|-
| Fading West
| Rock/Contemporary Album of the Year
| 
|-
| align="center"rowspan="3"| 2019
| "Native Tongue"
| Rock/Contemporary Recorded Song of the Year
| 
|-
| Native Tongue
| Rock/Contemporary Album of the Year
| 
|-
| Native Tongue
| Recorded Music Packaging of the Year
| 
|-
| align="center"rowspan="3"|2022
| Interrobang
| Rock/Contemporary Album of the Year
| 
|-

Grammy Awards
The Grammy Awards are awarded annually by the National Academy of Recording Arts and Sciences to recognize outstanding achievement in the music industry. Switchfoot has received two Grammy nominations for their albums, and won once in 2011.

|-
| align="center"| 2001
| Learning to Breathe
| Best Rock Gospel Album
| 
|-
| align="center"| 2011
| Hello Hurricane
| Best Rock or Rap Gospel Album
| 
|-

Orville H. Gibson Guitar Awards

|-
| align="center"| 2001
| Jon Foreman
| Les Paul Horizon Award (for the most promising up-and-coming guitarist)
| 
|-

Rock on Request Awards
The Rock on Request Awards are an American annual music awards held by the music webzine Rock on Request.

|-
| 2009
| Switchfoot
| Best Christian Artist
| 
|-

San Diego Music Awards
San Diego Music Awards are held annually in San Diego, California to recognize the best bands and artists in local music.

|-
| align="center"|  1997
| Switchfoot
| Best New Artist
| 
|-
| align="center" rowspan="2"| 2001
| Switchfoot
| Best Pop Artist
| 
|-
| Learning to Breathe
| Best Pop Album
| 
|-
| align="center"| 2002
| Switchfoot
| Best Adult Alternative Artist
| 
|-
| align="center" rowspan="2" | 2003
| rowspan="2" | The Beautiful Letdown
| Best Pop Album
| 
|-
| Album of the Year
| 
|-
| align="center"| 2004
| "Dare You to Move"
| Song of the Year
| 
|-
| align="center"| 2006
| Switchfoot
| Artist of the Year
| 
|-
| align="center"| 2007
| Oh! Gravity
| Album of the Year
| 
|-
| align="center"| 2010
| Hello Hurricane
| Album of the Year
| 
|-
| align="center"| 2011
| Switchfoot
| Artist of the Year
| 
|-
| align="center" rowspan="2"| 2012
| Switchfoot
| Artist of the Year
| 
|-
| "Afterlife"
| Song of the Year
| 
|-

References

Awards
Switchfoot